Chiquititas is an Argentine telenovela, created by Cris Morena. It was very successful in every country where it was broadcast. The cast recorded seven albums as soundtracks, and the songs were written by Cris Morena (credited as Cristina de Giacomi).

La Música de Chiquititas 

Track listing

"Rechufas"
"Había una vez"
"Señales"
"¿Por qué Dios?"
"Hasta diez"
"Mentiritas"
"Todo Todo"
"Igual a los demás"
"Blue Jean Baby Tatuá"
"Te encontré"

La Música de Chiquititas - Volumen 2 

Track listing

"Al Fin"
"Me Pasan Cosas"
"Me Hace Llorar"
"Corazón con Agujeritos"
"El Chef Saverio"
"Chufacha"
"Malísima"
"Crecer"
"A Berlín"
"Amigas"

Felices Fiestas Con Chiquititas 

Track listing
"Año Nuevo"
"En Él Comienzo"
"Navidad"
"Ángeles Cocineros"

La Música de Chiquititas - Volumen 3 

Track listing

"Penitas"
"La Edad del Pavo"
"Por Una Sola Vez"
"¿Qué Hiciste Qué?"
"Todavía"
"Rinconcito de Luz"
"Papá"
"Enamorada de Todos"
"Brujas Feas"
"El Beso"
"Chufachon"

Chiquititas Vol. 4 

Track listing

"Dame una CH"
"Estoy Loco"
"Chiquititas"
"Lu, Lucita"
"Celeste y Blanco"
"Pimpollo"
"Estúpida, Romántica Idiota"
"Volar Mejor"
"No Puede Ser"
"24 Horas"
"Juguete Para Armar"

Chiquititas Vol. 5 

Track listing

Siempre Chiquititas"
"Patito Feo"
"Soltate"
"Candela"
"Álbum de la Vida"
"Adolescente"
"Ventanita"
"Sr. Amor"
"Pajarito"
"Recordar"

Notes

A second version of "Todo Todo" was recorded by the cast, and features a new music video, although being only used in presentations on stage. For unknown reasons, Ana and Juan's love theme "Mundos Diferentes" is also absent from the track listing.

Chiquititas Vol. 6 

Track listing

"Chiquititas 2000"
"Mi Chica"
"Tilín Tilín"
"Te Miro y Tiemblo"
"Rebelde"
"Pequeño Amor"
"Pan y Queso"
"Luz de Estrella"
"Compañero"
"Abre, Entra"

Notes

A version of "Pienso En Ti" was Felipe and Camila's love theme in Chiquititas 2000, although it is not part of the album. A new version of "Todo Todo", sung by actress Romina Gaetani was also recorded, but exclusively for stage presentations.

Chiquititas Vol. 7 

Track listing

"Amor Chiquito"
"Pacto De Amor"
"Esperanza"
"Ay Amor"
"Ventanita De Los Suenos"
"Amigo Mio"
"Vuela"
"Chiquititas Baila Así"
"Todo Bien"
"Mi Vida Es Mía"
"Chiquititas Baila Así" (instrumental)
"Rebelde" (instrumental)

Notes

Mili's theme "Ventanita De Los Sueños" samples "Había Una Vez" and "Por Una Sola Vez", two earlier themes sung by Agustina Cherri (and her character Mili).

Chiquititas: Rincón de Luz 

Track listing

"Rinconcito de luz - abertura chiquititas"
"Pimpollo"
"Hasta Diez"
"Penitas"
"Había Una Vez"
"Pienso En Ti"
"Todo Todo"
"Rebelde"
"Ángeles cocineros"
"Rinconcito de Luz"

Notes
"Pienso En Ti" ("I Think Of You") was originally composed by Cris Morena for her television show Jugate Conmigo. The theme was sung by actor Michel Brown, a cast member of Jugate, and years later, after being translated and adapted to Brazilian Portuguese, was used in Chiquititas Brasil Season Four, as Fran and Samuca's love theme "Penso Em Ti". In Chiquititas 1999 (Season Five), it became Felipe and Camila's love theme, which they once again sang in the Chiquititas feature film.

The film's score features instrumental versions of some themes originally used in the television series. "Te Encontré" ("I Found You"), Belén and Martín's love theme from Chiquititas Season One, can be heard in the scene where Alejo survives the explosion and Belén swim to his arms.

24 Horas 

Chiquititas Sin Fin featured new versions for earlier Chiquititas songs.

Track listing

"Chiquititas 2006"
"Corazón con Agujeritos"
"Todo Todo"
"Mentiritas"
"Amigas"
"Estoy Loco"
"Hasta Diez"
"Por Una Sola Vez"
"24 Horas"
"Dónde Estás"
"Había Una Vez"
"Malísima"
"Igual A Los Demás"
"Me Pasan Cosas"
"Volar Mejor"

Notes

The Chiquititas 2006 main theme is actually Jugate Conmigo'''s main theme rewritten for Chiquititas Sin Fin. Lili's theme "Donde Estás" is the only new song in the Sin Fin'' track listing.

Chiquititas
Television soundtracks
1995 soundtrack albums
1996 soundtrack albums
1997 soundtrack albums
1998 soundtrack albums
1999 soundtrack albums
2000 soundtrack albums
2001 soundtrack albums
2006 soundtrack albums
Cast recordings